Rajpracha Football Club is a Thai professional football club. The club is currently playing in the Thai League 2.

History
Rajpracha formally founded in 1966 by Pol Maj-Gen Mom Rajawongse Jetjan Prawit in the name of "Ratchaprachanukroh Fire Fighting Football Team". In the past, the Rajprachanukroh Foundation organized training Thai Scout, therefore it has added sports into the scout curriculum by bringing footballers in those days to train football for children in which the club began as a youth team for the Police United.

In 1976 the club won the Thai FA Cup competition under the name of "Youth Development Team". In the 1998 Thailand Premier League season (Thailand Premier League 1998), Rajpracha FC played under the name "UCOM Rajpracha".

Rajpracha took part in the 1995/96 Asian Cup Winner's Cup. They had a bye to the second round, where they took on Indonesian outfit Petrokimia Putra, but they lost 7–7 on the away goals rule.

Honours

Domestic 
Kor Royal Cup
Champions: 1970, 1971, 1980, 1982
Khǒr Royal Cup
Champions: 2007
Thai FA Cup
Champions: 1976, 1977, 1984, 1994
Queen's Cup
Champions: 1972, 1981
Regional League Division 2
Champions: 2009
Regional League Bangkok Area Division
Champions: 2009
Regional League Bangkok & Eastern Division
Champions: 2016

Invitational 
'''Bordoloi Trophy
Runners-up: 2001

Stadium and locations

Seasons

Performance in AFC competitions

Current squad

Club staff

References

External links 
Official Website
Official Facebookpage

Association football clubs established in 1968
Football clubs in Thailand
1968 establishments in Thailand